Miranpur is a village in Naushahro Feroze, Sindh, Pakistan.  The population was 3000 at the 2017 census.

The Miranpur  a Palh community village and Deh of Union Council Miranpur  of Naushahro Feroze District in the Pakistan Province of Sindh. It is a large village of Naushahro Feroze District. This village has basic facilities of rural areas with Basic Health Unit, High School, Primary School. and Post Office.

History
Founded in 1932, the village changed its name to Miranpur in 1936, when many of the settlers came from their surrounded lands.

Geography
Miranpur is located at (68.2698333, 26.7326667).

Religion
Miranpur is predominantly Muslim, Sunni Bravli and Sunni Deobandi.

Notable people

References

List of cities near the village 
Padidan
Naushahro Feroze 
Darya Khan Mari 
Bhiria Road

External links
 Village website

Populated places in Naushahro Feroze District
Populated places established in 1932